Matthieu Labbé (born 26 January 1985 in Boulogne-sur-Mer) is a French football midfielder. Currently, he plays in the Championnat de France amateur for USL Dunkerque.

External links 
 Profile on French League
 Profile on Foot Mercato

Living people
1985 births
French footballers
Ligue 2 players
US Boulogne players
Association football midfielders